Deputy is a mid unincorporated community and census-designated place (CDP) in Graham Township, Jefferson County, Indiana, United States. As of the 2010 census it had a population of 86.

Geography
Indiana State Road 3 forms the eastern edge of the community; the highway leads north  to North Vernon and south  to Jeffersonville.

Deputy is located on land that is considered to be of karst topography.  The town and the area around it contain numerous sink holes and caves.

Climate
The climate in this area is characterized by hot, humid summers and generally mild to cool winters.  According to the Köppen Climate Classification system, Deputy has a humid subtropical climate, abbreviated "Cfa" on climate maps.

Demographics

Description
Primarily an agricultural community, Deputy residents farm timber, corn, soybeans, wheat, hay, tobacco as well as vegetables and fruits in season. Cattle, hogs, chickens, goats, sheep, horses and donkeys are typical of farm animals many residents raise in the Deputy area. 

There is no other town or community in the United States named Deputy.

History 
Deputy was laid out as a town in March 1871 by Foster C. Wilson, the husband of Margaret Mary Deputy and son-in-law of John and Harriet Deputy.

Local lore - and probably the source of the town's name - indicates that the area was first settled in the 1810s by a number of Deputy families that had migrated to Clark County, Indiana, from Sussex County, Delaware, probably as a result of the conclusion of the Treaty of Fort Wayne in September 1809 which opened up lands in the Indiana territory to American settlement.

Deputy Pike is the historic road which connects Deputy to the county seat, Madison. It eventually merges with State Highway 7, which runs southeast to Madison. Deputy Pike is a scenic route along the Muskatatuck River ("Big Creek" as it is known locally) along the road's western and central portions and along Harbert's Creek to the east. It runs by several cemeteries such as Robertson Cemetery and through the smaller communities of Wakefield and Volga. It was originally a toll road but has long since been publicly maintained by the county.

A notable historic site that once overlooked Deputy was a large tree. This tree was hundreds of years old and tales of the tree were said to be heard in Native American tribes throughout the area. The tree was located where the United States Post Office is now located.

Some other important places in the Deputy area are the United States Post Office, the Deputy Elementary School and Crop Production Services. The heavily forested rural area surrounding Deputy supports several sawmills including TinyTIMBERS, Baxter Lumber and Phillips Millwork.

Methodist Episcopal Camp Meetings 
Some notable churches in the area are the Deputy United Methodist Church, the Pisgah Methodist Church, the Open Door Baptist Church, the Bethany Baptist Church and the Lick Branch Baptist Church. Deputy is the area where the historic Deputy Camp Meetings were held by the Methodist Episcopal Church as part of the Second Great Awakening movement in the mid-1800s. These camp meetings - which initially featured "round the clock" evangelism and passionate "fire and brimstone" preaching to win new converts - were central features of the outreach of the Methodist church in the American frontiers. The Deputy Camp Meetings (first billed as "Beech Glen Camp Meeting") were the first such meetings held in Indiana in the late 1840s. They became part of the network of camp meetings organized under the Indiana Conference of the Methodist Episcopal Church. (See below historical photo) The camp meetings continued in the Deputy area until the start of World War I, gradually evolving into permanent congregations who built their own church buildings. Pisgah Methodist Church is the location of the Pissgay cemetery, which holds many graves from the Revolutionary era and Civil War era to the present.

Schools 
Located in Deputy is the Deputy Elementary School, part of the Madison Consolidated Schools system. As of 2020, the current principal is Janet McCreary. Deputy Elementary School is located near the site of the old Deputy High School. The Deputy Elementary School and the old Deputy High School mascot is a panther.

References

Census-designated places in Jefferson County, Indiana
Census-designated places in Indiana